The Kawasaki KLR250/KL250D was a motorcycle produced from 1984 to 2005 as the successor to the 1978 to 1983 KL250C, with only minor changes during the model run. This lightweight dualsport motorcycle was used for several years by the US military for a variety of tasks, including messenger duty and reconnaissance.

Development & Design

It was produced by Kawasaki Heavy Industries in Japan and exported to many parts of the world, including the U.S. and Canada, Europe and Australia. The Chilean national police ("Carabineros de Chile") made extensive use of the KLR250. It is similar in appearance to the larger KLR650.  The KLR250 shares many engine parts with an ATV sold by Kawasaki, the KSF250 "Mojave". 

In the USA the KLR250 was discontinued at the end of the 2005 model run and was replaced by the KLX250S in 2006.
In other markets the KLX250 was introduced in 2001 and has been sold to the current day.

Specifications
The base specifications have remained virtually unchanged throughout the production period.

Engine

 Type: Four-stroke, DOHC, four-valve, single cylinder liquid cooled
 Displacement: 249 cc
 Bore and Stroke: 74.0 x 58.0 mm
 Carburetor: Keihin CVK34
 Compression ratio: 11.0:1
 Power Output: 
 28 horsepower 1985–1989
 23 horsepower 1990–2005 @ 9,000 rpm, (U.S. model due to change in cam profile)
 Maximum torque: 23 N-m (2.3 kg-m, 16.5 ft-lb) @ 8,000 rpm (U.S. model)  
 Starting Method: Kick

Drivetrain
 
 Transmission: 6 Speed
 Final Drive: Chain EK520 L-O 104 links

Brakes
 
 Front: Hydraulic disc
 Rear: Drum

Suspension
 
 Front: Air-adjustable hydraulic telescopic fork
 Rear: UNI-TRAK single-shock system (adjustable)

Wheels and tires
 
 Front: 3.00 x 21 tire
 Rear: 4.60 x 17 tire

Dimensions

 Length: 84.3 in
 Seat height: 33.7 in
 Rake and Trail: 28.5 degrees / 4.6 in
 Wheelbase: 55.7 in
 Weight:  dry
 Fuel Capacity: 2.9 US gal (11.0 litres)
 Engine oil capacity: 2 liters

Fuel Efficiency

  (est)
 Maximum range: 188.5 U.S. miles

References

KLR250
Dual-sport motorcycles
Motorcycles introduced in 1984